Revaprazan (trade name Revanex) is a drug that reduces gastric acid secretion which is used for the treatment of gastritis. It acts as an acid pump antagonist (potassium-competitive acid blocker). Revaprazan is approved for use in South Korea, but is not approved in Europe or the United States.

References

Proton-pump inhibitors
Anilines
Organofluorides
Aminopyrimidines
Tetrahydroisoquinolines